Jean Pierre Fuentes Siguas (born October 18, 1991 in Lima) is a Peruvian footballer, who currently plays for Carlos A. Mannucci as a defensive midfielder.

Club career
Jean Pierre came through the youth divisions of Alianza Lima. He was promoted to the first team in 2008. He made his official debut against Alianza Atlético. In January 2011 he joined newly promoted team Cobresol FBC. He made his debut for Cobresol FBC on April 30, 2011 against Inti Gas Deportes.

References

External links
 
 
 

1991 births
Living people
Footballers from Lima
Association football midfielders
Peruvian footballers
Club Alianza Lima footballers
Cobresol FBC footballers
Unión Comercio footballers
León de Huánuco footballers
FBC Melgar footballers
Carlos A. Mannucci players
Peruvian Primera División players